The 2020 Latvian Athletics Championships was the 30th edition of the national outdoor track and field championships for Latvia. It took place from 8–9 August at Zemgale Olympic Center in Jelgava. The 10,000 metres championships were contested separately in Piltene on 4 July.

Results

Men

Women

References

Results
 Latvian Championships and Latvian U23 Championships. Latvian Athletics Federation. Retrieved 2021-03-21.

External links
 Latvian Athletics Federation website

Latvian Athletics Championships
Latvian Athletics Championships
Latvian Athletics Championships
Latvian Athletics Championships
Jelgava